Countess Dorothea of Hanau-Münzenberg (4 February 1556 – 5 September 1638), was a German noblewoman member of the House of Hanau by birth and by virtue of her two marriages Countess of Ortenburg and Gleichen-Kranichfeld-Ehrenstein-Blankenhain.

Life 
She was a daughter of Count Philip III of Hanau-Münzenberg and Countess Palatine Helena of Simmern.

On 15 June 1571 Dorothea married with Count Anton of Ortenburg (5 September 1530 – 23 May 1573), a member of the Aulic Council and governor of Heidenheim on behalf of Württemberg and son of Count Joachin of Ortenburg, who with his ally Frederick III, Elector Palatine established the Protestantism in his domains against the adjacent Roman Catholic Duchy of Bavaria ruled by Albert V. This marriage, in consequence, strengthened the Protestant cause in Germany and indirectly was seen as a threat to Bavaria. Moreover, Dorothea had a dowry of 10,000 florins, huge amount needed by the Ortenburg family who was short of money at that time because of their fight against Bavaria and the Aulic Council expenses of Anton caused considerable additional costs. Once betrothed, Anton and Dorothea where summoned at the court of the Elector Palatine in Heidelberg in May 1570, where the groom arrived from the Diet of Speyer. The wedding ceremony took place at Ortenburg Castle, followed by four days of festivities who costed 8,000 florins.

Anton died on 23 May 1573, leaving his wife pregnant. Seven months later, on 1 December 1573, Dorothea gave birth a son, Frederick, who only lived four days.

After the death of her husband and newborn son, the 17-year-old widow wanted to return with her family in Hanau. The financial settlement of this matter was slow. Only in 1575 Dorothea was able to leave Ortenburg, although the dispute continued until 1582. According to her father, this conflict cost him 23,000 guilders.

On 28 November 1585 Dorothea married with Count Volrad of Gleichen-Kranichfeld-Ehrenstein-Blankenhain (4 March 1556 – 8 March 1627), who was a student at University of Jena during 1573-1576. They had five children. Dorothea's second marriage ended in divorce in 1596. She never remarried.

Dorothea died on 5 September 1638. At her funeral, a funeral sermon was published.

Issue
A daughter (baptized on 3 March 1587 in Blankenhain – d. before 1623).
A daughter (baptized on 18 February 1588 in Blankenhain – d. before 1623).
Dorothea Susanne (d. 1638), heiress of Blankenhain and Kranichfeld; married on 1. November 1619 to Baron George of Mörsperg and Beffort (d. 1648).
Anna Elisabeth (d. young).
Frederick William (d. 1599).

Ancestors

Notes

References 

 Adrian Willem Eliza Dek: De Afstammelingen van Juliana van Stolberg tot aan het jaar van de vrede van Munster, in: Spiegel der Historie. vol. 3, nº. 7/8, 1968.
 Reinhard Suchier: Genealogie des Hanauer Grafenhauses, in: Festschrift des Hanauer Geschichtsvereins zu seiner fünfzigjährigen Jubelfeier am 27. August 1894, Hanau, 1894
 Ernst J. Zimmermann: Hanau Stadt und Land, 3rd ed., Hanau, 1919, reprinted: 1978
 Gunter Wieland: Anton Graf zu Ortenburg (1550-1573) – frühes Ende einer großen Hoffnung. In: Förderkreis Bereich Schloss Ortenburg (Hrsg.): Ortenburg - Reichsgrafschaft und 450 Jahre Reformation 1563-2013. Ortenburg 2013, pp. 96–100.

House of Hanau
1556 births
1638 deaths
German countesses
16th-century German people
17th-century German people